Presidential elections were held in Seychelles on 31 August and 2 September 2001. They were won by the incumbent president, France-Albert René, who beat his nearest rival Wavel Ramkalawan by just under 5,000 votes.

Results

Presidential elections in Seychelles
Seychelles
2001 in Seychelles
August 2001 events in Africa
September 2001 events in Africa